John Foord-Kelcey (2 October 1860 – 10 January 1931) was an English first-class cricketer.

Foord-Kelcey was born at Smeeth near Ashford, Kent as John Foord, with the family changing its name to Foord-Kelcey in May 1872. He was educated at Chatham House Grammar School, before going up to Pembroke College, Oxford. While studying at Oxford, he made two appearances in first-class cricket for Oxford University in 1883, against the Gentlemen of England at Oxford and the Marylebone Cricket Club at Lord's. Against the Gentlemen of England, he took a five wicket haul with figures of 6 for 58 and took nine wickets in the match overall. He later died at Gloucester in January 1931. His brother, William, and nephew Osbert Mordaunt both played first-class cricket.

References

External links

1860 births
1931 deaths
People from Smeeth
People educated at Chatham House Grammar School
Alumni of Pembroke College, Oxford
English cricketers
Oxford University cricketers